The Indian National Open Athletics Championships is an annual outdoor track and field competition organised by the Athletics Federation of India, which serves as the national championship for the sport in India. First held in 1961, it is one of four major national events in track and field, alongside the annual Indian Inter State Senior Athletics Championships and Federation Cup Senior Athletics Championships, as well as the biennial National Games of India.

The 1994 edition featured foreign athletes who were invited as part of celebrations of the opening of the Jawaharlal Nehru Stadium in Chennai. The venue for the championships changes each year, and it is typically held over four days in the period from August to October.

Events
The competition programme features a total of 38 individual Indian Championship athletics events, 19 for men and 19 for women. For each division, there are seven track running events, three obstacle events, four jumps, four throws, and one combined event. Separate annual championship events are held for cross country running, the marathon and road racewalking events.

Track running
100 metres, 200 metres, 400 metres, 800 metres, 1500 metres, 5000 metres, 10,000 metres
Obstacle events
100 metres hurdles (women only), 110 metres hurdles (men only), 400 metres hurdles, 3000 metres steeplechase
Jumping events
Pole vault, high jump, long jump, triple jump
Throwing events
Shot put, discus throw, javelin throw, hammer throw
Combined events
Decathlon (men only), heptathlon (women only)

The women's programme was limited initially, though has since expanded to match the men's events. The women's 3000 metres was amended to the 5000 m in 1995 to match the men's distance. Women's triple jump and hammer throw were added in 1995, followed by the pole vault in 1999, and finally the women's 3000 m steeplechase in 2003.

Editions

References

Athletics competitions in India
National athletics competitions
Recurring sporting events established in 1961
Athletics